Sikkim Professional University, erstwhile Vinayaka Missions Sikkim University, Gangtok, Sikkim, India is a State Private University founded in the year 2008 under Sikkim Professional University Act, Sikkim (Act No. 11 of 2008) of Sikkim State Assembly. SPU is recognized by the University Grants Commission of India (UGC), The Indian Nursing Council (INC), and the Pharmacy Council of India (PCI). Formerly, the University was well known by Vinayaka Missions Sikkim University but now the name has been amended to Sikkim Professional University as per The Vinayaka Missions Sikkim University (Amendment) Act, 2020; (Act No 09 of 2020).

Academics

Sikkim Professional University offers Under Graduate Degree Programme & Post Graduate Degree Programme in all major disciplines including Arts, Commerce and science. 

College of Arts and Social Science 
College of Engineering & Technology 
College of Business Management and Administrative Studies
College of Computer and Information Technology
College of Pharmaceutical and Paramedical Science 
College of Library Sciences
College of Nursing
College of Agreculture

References

External links

Universities in Sikkim
Universities and colleges in Sikkim
Educational institutions established in 2008
Gangtok
2008 establishments in Sikkim